David Doty may refer to:
 David B. Doty, (born 1950), American composer and authority on just intonation
 David S. Doty (born 1929), U.S. federal judge 
 David Doty (actor), actor in Shades of Ray